Pride of Maryland is a 1951 American drama film directed by Philip Ford and written by John K. Butler. The film stars Stanley Clements, Peggy Stewart, Frankie Darro, Joe Sawyer, Robert Barrat and Harry Shannon. The film was released on January 20, 1951 by Republic Pictures.

Plot
Horse trainer Frankie Longworth discovers that his former sweetheart Christine is now married to jockey Steve Loomis. He seeks work, plus a chance to demonstrate his new "crouch" style of racing. Frankie ends up barred from racing after an ethical breach, and Steve is killed in a fall from a horse.

After finding work with Sir Thomas Asbury, who wants to take him to England, the disgraced Frankie is able to gain back his license and rides Christine's horse, Pride of Maryland, to victory.

Cast    
Stanley Clements as Frankie Longworth
Peggy Stewart as Christine Loomis
Frankie Darro as Steve Loomis
Joe Sawyer as Knuckles
Robert Barrat as Colonel Harding 
Harry Shannon as Walter Shannon
Duncan Richardson as Stevie Loomis
Stanley Logan as Sir Thomas Asbury
Joseph Crehan as Mr. Herndon
Emmett Vogan as Dr. Paley
Clyde Cook as Fred Leach
Donald Kerr as Referee
Guy Bellis as Lord Blanford

References

External links
 

1951 films
American drama films
1951 drama films
Republic Pictures films
Films directed by Philip Ford
American black-and-white films
1950s English-language films
1950s American films